Tamás Csehi (born 6 February 1984 in Kalocsa) is a Hungarian football player who currently plays for Harta SE.

References
HLSZ

1984 births
Living people
People from Kalocsa
Hungarian footballers
Association football midfielders
Dunaújváros FC players
Pécsi MFC players
Paksi FC players
Szolnoki MÁV FC footballers
Dunaújváros PASE players
Nemzeti Bajnokság I players
Sportspeople from Bács-Kiskun County